The Toledo Rockets baseball team is a varsity intercollegiate athletic team of the University of Toledo in Toledo, Ohio. The team is a member of the Mid-American Conference West division, which is part of the National Collegiate Athletic Association's Division I. Toledo's first baseball team was fielded in 1921. The team plays its home games at Scott Park Baseball Complex in Toledo, Ohio.

History

In 1999, Joe Kruzel became the first Toledo manager to be named the MAC Coach of the Year. Jeremy Griffiths was named the conference's Pitcher of the Year in the same season.

In 2012, the Rockets were the regular season champions of the MAC West division for the first time in their history.

On May 20, 2019, Cory Mee stepped down as head coach after 16 seasons. On July 8, 2019, Rob Reinstetle was hired as head coach.

In 2021, Chris Meyers was named the Mid-American Conference Baseball Player of the Year. He was the first player in program history to receive that honor.

See also
List of NCAA Division I baseball programs

References

External links
 

 
Baseball teams established in 1921
1921 establishments in Ohio